Arab salad or Arabic salad is any of a variety of salad dishes that form part of Arab cuisine. Combining many different fruits and spices, and often served as part of a mezze, Arab salads include those from Algeria and Tunisia such as the "Algerian salad" (Salata Jaza'iriya) and "black olive and orange salad" (Salatat Zaytoon) and from Tunisia Salata Machwiya is a grilled salad made from peppers, tomatoes, garlic and onions with olives and tuna on top, those from Syria and Lebanon such as "artichoke salad" (Salataf Khurshoof) and "beet salad" (Salatat Shamandar), and those from Palestine and Jordan. Other popular Arab salads eaten throughout the Arab world include fattoush and tabouli.

A recipe for Arab salad in Woman's Day magazine includes diced tomato, cucumber and onion. Often mixed with parsley and combined with the juice of freshly squeezed lemon and olive oil, Arabic salad contains no lettuce. All the vegetables, except the onion, are left unpeeled, and the salad should be served immediately. Other variations include serving with fried pita slices or adding sumac to the lemon and oil dressing. Among Palestinians, this Arabic salad is known as Salatat al-Bundura ("tomato salad") and is popularly served alongside rice dishes.

Similar salads in the Middle East include the Persian salad shirazi, and Turkish choban salad.

See also
 List of Arabic salads
 List of hors d'oeuvre

References

Bibliography

Arab cuisine
Mediterranean cuisine
Levantine cuisine
Jordanian cuisine
Syrian cuisine
Lebanese cuisine
Iraqi cuisine
Palestinian cuisine
Salads
Appetizers
Vegetable dishes

he:סלט ערבי